Cardinal is one of the most common surnames among aboriginal people in Canada (primarily Cree and Métis).  It originated as a French name and came to New France and was part of the North American fur trade by the 1680s.  In the 1780s, a small group of Cardinals came from Quebec to what is now northern Alberta to work in the fur trade, they stayed and intermarried with the local native peoples and reproduced prolifically.  As a result, thousands of Cree and Métis people from across Alberta and beyond can trace their descent to the Cardinals.

Surname
 Aurèle Cardinal, Canadian architect
 Brian Cardinal, American basketball player
 Douglas Cardinal (born 1934), Canadian architect
 Fernando Cardinal, Portuguese futsal player
 Gil Cardinal, Canadian architect of Métis descent
 Harold Cardinal (1945–2005), Cree writer and political leader
 Jean-Guy Cardinal, Québécois politician
 Joseph-Narcisse Cardinal, Lower Canadian politician and rebel
 Judah ben Isaac Cardinal (13th century), Arabic-Hebrew translator
 Linda Cardinal (born 1959), Canadian political scientist
 Lorne Cardinal, Canadian actor
 Marie Cardinal (1929–2001), French novelist.
 Martin Cardinal, Canadian police officer and subject of controversy
 Mark Cardinal, Canadian rugby player
 Mike Cardinal, Canadian politician
 Tantoo Cardinal, Canadian actress

Other
 Kardinal Offishall, stage name of Canadian rapper and producer Jason Drew Harrow

See also
 Cardinal (disambiguation)
 Cardenal, Spanish surname
 Cardinale, Italian surname

References

Native American surnames
First Nations culture
Cree culture
Métis culture
History of Alberta